Attenhofen is a municipality located in the district of Kelheim in Bavaria in Germany.

History
Attenhofen was established as a parish in 1413, according to old sources; the parish church was established sometime after the Battle of Lechfeld in 955.

In 1886, 19 people from Attenhofen took part in the Austro-Prussian War and the Franco-Prussian War.

In 1903, the population of Attenhofen was about 440 people; of those, 435 were Catholic.

References

Bibliography

Kelheim (district)